Gil Doron Reichstadt Ofarim (born 13 August 1982) is a German singer, songwriter, and actor, also known as the lead singer of the bands Zoo Army and Acht.

Early life
Ofarim is the first child of Israeli musician Abi Ofarim (1937–2018), whose career – both solo and with first wife Esther Ofarim – dates back several decades, and his third wife Sandra. He has a younger brother, Tal, a musician, who was born in 1984. Gil speaks German, Hebrew and English. He sings in English and German.

Music career
Ofarim's showbiz career took off in May 1997 when he was spotted in a Munich underground station by a talent scout for Bravo magazine and was asked to do a pictorial story spread. The article generated thousands of letters from fans and he landed a recording contract with BMG. His first single "Round 'n' Round (It Goes)" was released in November 1997 and became a top 40 hit in Germany. Ofarim' debut album Here I Am was released to international success in May 1998.

2003–2007: On My Own

After several other successful singles, Ofarim became increasingly disenchanted with being a teen idol. His 2003 album On My Own, released on Neotone Records, showcased his move in a different musical direction, taking his work further into the pop rock and adult contemporary genres. While the album failed to chart, it produced the single "The Reason" and led to a stint as Bon Jovi's opening act on the German leg of their Bounce Tour. In 2004, Ofarim ventured into acting when he co-starred in the ProSieben coming-of-age film Endlich Sex! alongside Jasmin Schwiers. In it, he played musician Christoph, the love interest of lead role Saskia. The film was broadcast to moderate ratings but was largely panned by critics. Ofarim performed several songs in Endlich Sex!, including "In Your Eyes" which was released by Neotone as a single in March 2004.

Starting in 2005, Ofarim became the lead singer of the rock band Zoo Army, also consisting of his brother Tal, Roland Söns and Dominik Scholz. They released their first single "I'm Alive" and their debut album 507 in the first half of 2006. The same year, he had a supporting role in the RTL two-part television drama film , a fictionalized ensemble story depicting the events surrounding the North Sea flood of 1962. Starring a roster of bankable television actors such as Jan Josef Liefers and Götz George, the film earned largely favorable reviews and strong ratings. Also in 2016, Ofarim played the lead role in the American b movie Strip Mind, which opened in Germany on 3 January 2007. The psychological thriller was largely panned by critics who criticized its casting, pacing and the "horrible" synchronization. The following year, Disney consulted him to record "So nah," the German version of Jon McLaughlin's "So Close" from the musical fantasy film Enchanted (2007) as well as "Mehr als du seh’n kannst," a re-written version of Rufus Wainwright's "Another Believer," for the computer-animated science fiction comedy film Meet the Robinsons (2007).

2008–present: Band career and Alles auf Hoffnung
In 2008, Ofarim had a guest role in an episode of the children's television series Ein Fall für B.A.R.Z.. The same year, he formed another rock band, Acht, along with Oswin Ottl, Petros Kontos, and Andy Lind. Their debut album, Stell dir vor, entirely recorded in German and released in 2010, reflected a new domestic-marketing approach. The quartet supported American singer Alex Band throughout his European concert tour. Also in 2020, Ofarim had appeared as a guest in the ZDF crime television series Ein starkes Team. In October 2012, Ofarim was a contestant on the second season of The Voice of Germany. Coached by singer Xavier Naidoo, he was eliminated in the season's quarter final. His live performances of The Goo Goo Dolls's "Iris" (1998) and Michael Jackson's "Man in the Mirror" both entered the German Singles Chart and marked his first chart entries in a decade.

In 2013, Ofarim had a recurring role a Mick in the mystery series Armans Geheimnis, produced by and broadcast on Das Erste. In 2017, he took part in the German TV series  Let's Dance and became winner with his dance partner Ekaterina Leonova. On 1 August 2019, he was revealed to be the Grasshopper on The Masked Singer where he was placed as runner-up.

Personal life
In 2007, a newly identified species of moth from the Amata genus and found in Mount Hermon in the Golan Heights was named Amata gil after him.

On 15 December 2014 Gil married his longtime girlfriend Verena Brock. On 6 March 2015 the couple welcomed their first child, a son Leonard (Leo) Dean Ofarim. On 30 January 2017 the couple welcomed their second child, a daughter Anouk Marie Ofarim. 

The couple separated, giving Gil full custody of the children. However the exact date and year of this is still not exact. Gil Ofarim has kindly asked that all press and media leave him and Verena Brock alone during this difficult time.

Star of David libel case
In October 2021, Ofarim attracted international attention through a video he posted on Instagram and titled “Antisemitismus in Deutschland 2021”, in which he spoke about experiencing pain and embarrassment from antisemitic treatment while checking in at the Leipzig Westin hotel. Ofarim said that he was told to put away his Star of David pendant by a manager, otherwise they would not check him in. His Instagram video was shared widely, also by the American Jewish Congress, which then started an online petition calling the hotel owner, Marriott, to apologize and educate its employees about antisemitism. On October 5th, about 600 people congregated in front of the hotel to protest antisemitism.

Later, the statements by Ofarim were contradicted by two hotel employees and three guests, and according to closed-circuit television recordings, Ofarim did not wear a visible neck chain during the time in question. Confronted with the footage, Ofarim then explained that the exclamation came from behind, and that it was not about the star or the chain, but “about something far bigger.” as he told he was recognized as he appeared in television. Ofarim claimed the hotel did not release the whole footage. Five witnesses furthermore mentioned during a police investigation that Ofarim had used swearwords against the hotel while in the lobby, threatening staff to "post an Instagram video that will go viral". Ofarim did not respond to an inquiry made by Die Zeit investigating whether Ofarim blackmailed the employee. 

In March 2022, the German Public Prosecutor's Office discontinued proceedings against the hotel employee and brought charges against Ofarim for libel and false suspicion.

Discography

Studio albums

Singles
 "Round ’n’ Round (It Goes)" (1997)
 "Never Giving Up Now" (1998)
 "If You Only Knew" (featuring The Moffatts) (1998)
 "Here I Am" (1998)
 "Let the Music Heal Your Soul" (featuring Various Artists) (1998)
 "Talk to You" (1998)
 "Calling" (1998) (featuring Karylle)
 "Walking Down the Line" (1999)
 "Out of My Bed (Still in My Head)" (1999)
 "It's Your Love" (2000)
 "The Reason" (2003)
 "She" (2003 – not released)
 "In Your Eyes" (2004)
 "I'm Alive" (Zoo Army) (2006)
 "Still" (Acht) (2010)

References

http://www.starsontv.com/2012/10/25/the-voice-of-germany-gil-ofarim-startet-letzten-versuch/artikel-0021444/#.T5OYdfvyZK4
http://www.welt.de/regionales/muenchen/article110230644/Ofarim-Sohn-Gil-will-sein-Comeback-starten.html

External links

 Official website
 Official Zoo Army website
 Official Acht website

1982 births
Living people
Musicians from Munich
German people of Israeli descent
German people of Syrian-Jewish descent
German pop singers
German Sephardi Jews
20th-century German Jews
Jewish singers
Jewish songwriters
German  male singer-songwriters
21st-century German male singers